The Dalhousie Tigers are the men's and women's athletic teams that represent Dalhousie University in Halifax, Nova Scotia, Canada. The Tigers field 14 varsity teams with seven men's teams and seven women's teams that primarily compete in the Atlantic University Sport conference of U Sports. The university also offers numerous intramural and club sports that are available to students, staff, alumni, and Dalpex members.

Varsity teams

Men's basketball 
The Tigers men's basketball program has won nine AUS conference championships, including seven within nine years (from the 2014–15 season to 2021–22). In the National Tournament, the Tigers won a bronze medal in 2017 and a silver medal in 2020. The team plays their home games at the Dalplex fieldhouse.

Women's basketball 
The Tigers women's basketball team has finished as conference champions 11 times, with the most recent coming in the 2000–01 season. Historically, the team has won a silver medal in the U Sports women's basketball championship in 1980 and a bronze medal in 1982. The team plays their home games at the Dalplex fieldhouse.

Men's hockey 
The Tigers men's hockey team has won one conference championship, with the title being awarded following the 1978–79 season.

Women's hockey 

The Tigers women's ice hockey program began in 2002 and qualified for the U Sports Women's Ice Hockey Tournament in 2006.

Men's soccer 
The Tigers men's soccer team are tied with the Saint Mary's Huskies for the second-most AUS conference championships (13), with their most recent in the 2008 season. The program boasts a national championship win in the 1995 edition of the U Sports Men's Soccer Championship. The team was also a bronze medal winner in the 1992 and 1997 tournaments.

Women's soccer 
The Tigers women's soccer team has won the most AUS conference championships in U Sports women's soccer with 12 titles earned, the most recent coming in 2012. The program has won the most national championships among all Dalhousie varsity sports with three Gladys Bean Memorial Trophy wins. The gold medals were won in 1994, 1999, and 2000 while the team won silver medals in 1993 and 1995 and a bronze medal in 1998.

Men's volleyball 
The Tiger's men's volleyball program features 36 AUS conference championship winners within 44 years (first in the 1971–72 season and last in the 2014–15 season). However, after the disbanding of the Moncton Aigles Bleus team in 2006, the AUS featured only three teams, so interlock play with the RSEQ was featured heavily. The conference was further reduced to two following the folding of the Memorial Sea-Hawks after the 2016–17 season, leaving the program in jeopardy since the AUS requires a three-team minimum for varsity leagues. However, the AUS allowed Dalhousie and the UNB Varsity Reds to play a transitional season before joining the RSEQ as full members for the 2018–19 season.

On the national stage, in the U Sports men's volleyball championship, the men's volleyball team has finished with a silver medal in 1997 and with bronze medals in 1994 and 1995.

Women's volleyball 
The Tiger's women's volleyball team has won the most conference championships in the AUS with 27 titles won, including ten in a row from 2013 to 2023. The program features a U Sports women's volleyball championship team, having won a gold medal in 1982. The team also won a silver medal in 1984.

Club teams
The Dalhousie Tigers offer students the opportunity to play club sports for their university in lieu of these sports not being supported at the varsity level. The sports include, but are not limited to, baseball, cheerleading, curling, field hockey, Canadian football, lacrosse, rugby, tennis, and ultimate frisbee. Some sports were formerly offered as varsity sports, but either retained or resurrected as informal club sports.

Football 
The Tigers football team first began play as an intermediate team in 1947 in the Halifax City Canadian Football League. The program was in operation until 1976 when the school decided to cease its operations and funding. The team did not win a Jewett Trophy conference championship while playing in what is now the AUS.

In 2010, with the support of Dalhousie alumni, volunteer coaches, and the Student Football Club Executive, the Tigers football team was revived as a club sport and began play in the upstart Atlantic Football League, along with the University of New Brunswick Saint John, University of New Brunswick Fredericton, and Holland College. The Tigers played in the Moosehead Cup in their inaugural year, but lost to the UNBSJ Seawolves by a score of 40–6 on November 20, 2010. The team had mixed success until they went undefeated in 2016 and captured their first Moosehead Cup on November 5, 2016, in a 29–11 victory over the three-time defending champion Holland Hurricanes. The Tigers won a second Moosehead Cup championship in 2018 with another undefeated season being capped by a win over the Hurricanes. The team won their third championship in 2021 following a 40–14 victory over the UNBF Red Bombers. The team won their fourth championship in 2022, following a 27–26 victory over the UNBF Red Bombers.

Awards and honours

Athletes of the Year

References

External links
 

Dalhousie University
U Sports teams
Sports teams in Nova Scotia
Sport in Halifax, Nova Scotia